David Jean Nielsen (born 1 December 1976) is a Danish former professional footballer and manager.

He played for a number of Danish clubs, as well as Fortuna Düsseldorf in Germany and English clubs Grimsby Town, Wimbledon and Norwich City. His greatest triumph was the 1997 Danish Cup victory, which he won with Danish club F.C. Copenhagen. He played 46 matches and scored 33 goals for various Danish youth national teams between 1992 and 1997, including eight games and three goals for the Denmark U21 national team.

Nielsen has attracted controversy at various times in his career for falling into serious gambling debt, assaulting a teammate and then, in November 2008, admitting matchfixing in a Danish game played in 2004.

Playing career
Born in Sønderborg but raised inSkagen, Nielsen started playing youth football in Skagen IK and Frederikshavn fI. He scored 17 goals in 24 matches for the Danish under-16 and under-17 national teams. He received offers from English club Tottenham Hotspur and Bayern Munich in Germany, but decided to stay in Denmark, as he was brought to OB in the top-flight Danish Superliga in May 1993, 16 years old. Here he became known for his elaborate goal celebration, a round off stretch jump with a backtuck.

He was loaned out to Lyngby FC in January 1996, where he got his national breakthrough with 10 goals in 13 league games. When his Odense contract ran out in the Summer 1996, he moved abroad to play for Fortuna Düsseldorf in the Bundesliga championship. He did not find playing success with the club, and after half a year in Germany, Nielsen moved back to Denmark to play for F.C. Copenhagen in a DEM 600,000 transfer deal in February 1997. He played three and a half years at F.C. Copenhagen, with whom he won the 1997 Danish Cup. He was club top goalscorer in 1998, 1999 and 2000, and was elected 1999 F.C. Copenhagen Player of the Year.

He was loaned out to English club Grimsby Town in the second tier of English football, the English First Division in October 2000, as Grimsby had a hard time scoring goals. When his loan deal ended in March 2001, Nielsen moved on to English club Wimbledon F.C. on a free transfer. He joined Norwich City F.C. on loan in December 2001, and scored five goals in five games during his loan spell, including one against his parent club, prompting Norwich manager Nigel Worthington to pay £210,000 to Wimbledon to secure his services on a permanent basis. Whilst playing for Norwich City he was a member of the team that reached the final of the First Division play-offs in May 2002. However, he was unable to maintain his initial impressive scoring rate and left the club at his own request to return to Denmark in August 2003.

He signed with Superliga club Aalborg BK (AaB), where he rediscovered his goalscoring ability. Following a training ground bust-up with teammate Allan Gaarde in February 2005, Nielsen was fired by the club. Within days, he was hired by league rivals FC Midtjylland, to replace Egyptian striker Mohamed Zidan. He was let go by FCM in May 2006, and he moved abroad to play for Norwegian club IK Start. He became an immediate hit scoring seven goals in 21 matches, but left the club during the reign of manager Stig Inge Bjørnebye. On 20 July 2007, he signed a three-year contract with the Danish Superliga side OB. On 26 March he went on a loan deal with the Norwegian club Strømsgodset Toppfotball, for the rest of 2008.

Nielsen was sold to the Norwegian club Brann as a part of a deal were Njougu Demba Nyren went in the opposite direction in January 2009. During his stay in Brann, Nielsen has spent most of his time as a substitute and when he has been playing he has had the role as a facilitator for the other striker Erik Huseklepp. After his contract with Brann expired in June 2010 Nielsen planned to stay in Bergen and together with Per Ove Ludvigsen and Kjetil Knutsen offer organized soccer practice for kids through a company called Max Fotball.

Controversies
By April 2004, David Nielsen and fellow AaB teammate Jimmy Nielsen had racked up a debt of €201,000 with bookmakers in Aalborg. AaB director Lynge Jacobsen decided to help out financially and arranged for gambling addiction counselling.

In his 2008 autobiography, Nielsen admitted playing to deliberately lose a Superliga match between AaB and his former club F.C. Copenhagen in May 2004. As AaB had lost the Danish Cup final to F.C. Copenhagen earlier that year, winning the Superliga would propel F.C. Copenhagen into the UEFA Champions League and hand their UEFA Cup-berth as the Danish Cup winners on to the losing finalists from AaB. Nielsen was also motivated by his gambling debts, as UEFA Cup qualification would wield him a personal DKK300,000 bonus. AaB and F.C. Copenhagen drew the match, and F.C. Copenhagen eventually won the 2003–04 Superliga championship by one point.

In February 2005, Nielsen was sacked by AaB when he physically attacked teammate Allan Gaarde during a training session, leaving him with a concussion. Nielsen later explained in his autobiography that Gaarde was "pretentious... talking loudly about wine in Italian. "I told him: 'The next time you speak Italian I will break you in half. You're not f***ing Italian – you spent eight months there.' So when he did it again I decided to break his shitting legs like sticks. I jumped at him and bang. Jackpot. Felt good."

During the pre-season of 2010–11, in a friendly against English side Leeds United, he made a 'shocking high-footed' tackle against winger Robert Snodgrass, who was injured and missed the start of the campaign.

Managerial career
Nielsen was appointed assistant manager of Løv-Ham on 27 May 2011. Later that summer, he was appointed manager of Nest-Sotra. After saving the club from relegation from the 2. Divisjon in 2011, he led them to a 4th place in 2012 and promotion to the 1. division in 2013.

On 11 November 2013, he was appointed assistant manager of Strømsgodset. After just seven months, he was appointed manager, when Ronny Deila left for the vacant managing position at Celtic. On 26 May 2015, Strømsgodset announced that Nielsen would step down as manager in mutual agreement with the club.

On 17 June 2015, he signed a three-year-contract as manager for Danish 1st Division club Lyngby Boldklub.

On 30 September 2017, he signed a three-year contract as coach for Danish Superliga team AGF.

Personal life
David Nielsen was born in Denmark to a DR Congolese father, and a Danish mother.

Career statistics

Managerial statistics

Honours

As player
F.C. Copenhagen
Danish Cup: 1997

Individual
F.C. Copenhagen Player of the Year: 1999

As manager
Lyngby BK
 Danish 1st Division: 2015–16

References

Further reading
 .

External links

 
 Danish Superliga statistics 
 Ex-Canaries – Norwich City profile
 
 
 

1976 births
Living people
People from Skagen
Danish men's footballers
Association football forwards
Denmark under-21 international footballers
Denmark youth international footballers
Danish people of Democratic Republic of the Congo descent
Odense Boldklub players
Lyngby Boldklub players
AaB Fodbold players
F.C. Copenhagen players
Danish Superliga players
Grimsby Town F.C. players
Norwich City F.C. players
Wimbledon F.C. players
FC Midtjylland players
IK Start players
SK Brann players
Fortuna Düsseldorf players
Bundesliga players
Eliteserien players
Danish Superliga managers
Strømsgodset Toppfotball managers
Lyngby Boldklub managers
Aarhus Gymnastikforening managers
Eliteserien managers
Nest-Sotra Fotball managers
Sportspeople involved in betting scandals
Danish expatriate men's footballers
Danish expatriate sportspeople in Germany
Expatriate footballers in Germany
Danish expatriate sportspeople in England
Expatriate footballers in England
Danish expatriate sportspeople in Norway
Expatriate footballers in Norway
Danish 1st Division managers
Frederikshavn fI players
Sportspeople from the North Jutland Region